Javier Hernández Padilla (born September 22, 1952) is a semi-retired Mexican Luchador, or professional wrestler best known under the ring name Américo Rocca. Hernández also worked as the enmascarado (masked) Ponzoña from 1990 until 1994, and as Ninja Samurai for a brief time in 1994. Hernández is a former holder of the Mexican National Lightweight Championship and a three-time holder of both the Mexican National Welterweight Championship and the NWA World Welterweight Championship all promoted by the professional wrestling promotion Empresa Mexicana de Lucha Libre (EMLL).

Professional wrestling career
Hernández made his professional wrestling debut in 1975, using the ring name Xavier "Américo" Rocca, later shortened to just "Américo Rocca". Just over two years after his debut Rocca defeated Flama Azul to win the Mexican National Lightweight Championship; he held the title for 82 days before losing it back to Flama Azul. On February 2, 1978, Rocca won the Mexican National Welterweight Championship from Kung Fu, holding it for 435 days before losing it to Lizmark. The following year, on April 30, 1979, Rocca won the NWA World Welterweight Championship from Mano Negra. Rocca made several successful title defenses in the following 264 days before losing the title to Kato Kung Lee on January 19, 1980. Just under two months later he won the Mexican Welterweight title once more, defeating Lizmark to regain the title. His second Mexican Welterweight title run lasted 217 days before he lost the championship to Franco Columbo on November 1, 1980. On July 18, 1982, Rocca defeated La Fiera to win his second NWA World Welterweight Championship. After a reign lasting 558 days, he lost it to Mocho Cota. On March 29, 1985, Rocca won his third and final Mexican National Welterweight Championship by beating El Talisman for the championship. His final title reign lasted 156 days before he lost it to El Dandy. On February 11, 1986, Rocca won his last major title when he gained a measure of revenge against El Dandy by defeating him for the NWA World Welterweight Championship. His last title reign would also be his longest, lasting 606 days, before Solar II defeated him for the championship on June 30, 1988.

In 1990 Rocca adopted a new ring persona, Ponzoña (Spanish for "Poison"), a character used by Antonio Peña's father in the 1960s and brought back with Peña's permission. Hernández worked as the masked Ponzoña until 1994, after which he resumed working as Américo Rocca on the Mexican independent circuit. In recent years Hernández sons have begun wrestling as well under the names Américo Rocca, Jr. and Xavier Rocca.

Championships and accomplishments
Empresa Mexicana de Lucha Libre
Mexican National Lightweight Championship (3 times)
Mexican National Welterweight Championship (3 times)
NWA World Welterweight Championship (3 times)
Occidente Championships
Occidente Welterweight Championship (1 time)
Occidente Light Heavyweight Championship (1 time)
Local championships
Sinaloa Welterweight Championship (1 time)
Arena Azteca Budokan Welterweight Championship (1 time)

Luchas de Apuestas record

References

1952 births
Living people
Mexican male professional wrestlers
20th-century professional wrestlers
21st-century professional wrestlers
Mexican National Welterweight Champions
NWA World Welterweight Champions